The 2007 Texas State Bobcats football team was an American football team that represented Texas State University–San Marcos (now known as Texas State University) during the 2007 NCAA Division I FCS football season as a member of the Southland Conference (SLC). In their first year under head coach Brad Wright, the team compiled an overall record of 4–7 with a mark of 3–4 in conference play.

Schedule

References

Southwest Texas State
Texas State Bobcats football seasons
Southwest Texas State Bobcats football